Massimo Coda (born 10 November 1988) is an Italian professional footballer who plays as a striker for  club Genoa.

Career
Coda started his career at Cavese. At age of 16, he signed for Swiss Italian club Bellinzona. He then on loan to Cisco Roma, and Treviso made permanent move for the player in July 2007, for €350,000.

Bologna
On 26 June 2008, Bologna signed Coda in joint-ownership bid in 5-year contract (for €1.05 million, with Dino Fava returned to Treviso for €900,000 (i.e. €150,000 cash),) Coda was immediately left on loan to Cremonese. In June 2009 Bologna signed Coda outright, for €100,000, with Tedeschi also signed by Treviso outright, for €1,000. Coda remained in Cremona for 2 more seasons, with the club bought him in co-ownership deal for €150,000 (same amount of cash that Bologna paid in 2008) in June 2010. In June 2011 Coda returned to Bologna again for just €25,000, in a two-year contract. On 3 January 2012, Coda was loaned to Siracusa. On 31 August 2012, Coda left for San Marino Calcio on a free transfer.

Parma
In June 2013, Coda joined Parma for an undisclosed fee. On 1 July 2013, Coda was loaned to Slovenian club Gorica along with Bright Addae, Daniele Bazzoffia, Uroš Celcer, Alex Cordaz, Sebestyén Ihrig-Farkas, Alen Jogan, Gianluca Lapadula, Floriano Vanzo and Fabio Lebran (Crotone/Parma). The deals were finalized on 12 July. In the Slovenian PrvaLiga Coda made 33 appearances and scored 18 goals, finishing the 2013–14 Slovenian PrvaLiga second among the league's top goalscorers. After one season of playing in Slovenia he returned to Parma and made his Serie A debut for the club during the 2014–15 season. On 21 September 2014, on a match against Chievo, he came to the pitch as a substitute in the 63rd minute and finished the match with a goal and two assists, helping his side to a 3–2 away win. Coda was released by Parma in summer 2015 due to bankruptcy of the club.

Salernitana
On 29 August 2015, Coda signed for Salernitana on a three-year contract.

Benevento
On 1 July 2017, he joined Serie A newcomers Benevento. He spent three seasons in Benevento, scoring 34 goals in 95 games.

Lecce
On 26 August 2020 he joined Lecce. He ended the 2020–21 Serie B season as the league's top scorer with 22 goals, becoming the first Lecce player to be crowned top scorere in the Serie B and helping the club to achieve play-offs. In the following season he was the league's top scorer for a second time with 20 goals, helping Lecce to achieve promotion to Serie A.

Genoa
On 30 June 2022 Coda signed with Genoa.

Career statistics

Footnotes

References

External links
 
 
 
La Gazzetta dello Sport profile (2007–08 season) 
AIC profile 
PrvaLiga profile 

1988 births
Living people
People from Cava de' Tirreni
Sportspeople from the Province of Salerno
Italian footballers
Association football forwards
Serie A players
Serie B players
Serie C players
Swiss Challenge League players
Slovenian PrvaLiga players
Cavese 1919 players
AC Bellinzona players
Treviso F.B.C. 1993 players
F.C. Crotone players
Bologna F.C. 1909 players
U.S. Cremonese players
Atletico Roma F.C. players
Parma Calcio 1913 players
ND Gorica players
U.S. Salernitana 1919 players
Benevento Calcio players
U.S. Lecce players
Genoa C.F.C. players
Italian expatriate footballers
Expatriate footballers in Switzerland
Expatriate footballers in Slovenia
Italian expatriate sportspeople in Switzerland
Italian expatriate sportspeople in Slovenia
Footballers from Campania